Ayesha Raza Farooq is a Pakistani politician who has been a member of the Senate of Pakistan since March 2015. Previously she had been a member of the National Assembly of Pakistan from 2013 to 2015.

Education
She has a degree of Master of Business Administration which she received from Lahore University of Management Sciences in 1995 and has a degree of Bachelor of Laws which she obtained from University of Punjab in 2013.

Political career
She was elected to the National Assembly of Pakistan as a candidate of Pakistan Muslim League (N) (PML-N) on reserved seats for women from Punjab in 2013 Pakistani general election. In November 2013, she was appointed as Prime Minister's focal person on polio eradication. She resigned from National Assembly in March 2015.

She was elected to the Senate of Pakistan on reserved seat for women as a candidate of PML-N in 2015 Pakistani Senate election.

In March 2018, she received Sitara-i-Imtiaz from the Government of Pakistan for her role in polio eradication.

References

Living people
Pakistan Muslim League (N) politicians
Pakistani MNAs 2013–2018
Pakistani senators (14th Parliament)
Women members of the National Assembly of Pakistan
Year of birth missing (living people)
University of the Punjab alumni
Recipients of Sitara-i-Imtiaz
Women members of the Senate of Pakistan
21st-century Pakistani women politicians